Ergovaline is an ergopeptine and one of the ergot alkaloids. It is usually found in endophyte-infected species of grass like Tall fescue or Perennial Ryegrass. It is toxic to cattle feeding on infected grass, probably because it acts as a vasoconstrictor.

See also
 Neotyphodium coenophialum

References

External links

Ergot alkaloids
Oxazolopyrrolopyrazines
Lactams
Suspected female reproductive toxins